Arctopus is a genus of flowering plant in the Apiaceae, with three species. It is endemic to southern Africa. The genus name means "bears foot" (from   "bear" and  pous "foot") in reference to the curious growth habit, resembling a large footprint. The species were used in Khoisan medicine and adopted by the early settlers who gave them the Afrikaans name of sieketroos (= "sickness-comfort" i.e. "sickness remedy") They are atypical members of the Apiaceae with the leaves growing flat on the ground and are dioecious, having separate male and female plants.

Gallery

References 

Apioideae
Dioecious plants
Apioideae genera